This is a list of airports in the Bahamas, grouped by island and sorted by location.

The Bahamas, officially the Commonwealth of The Bahamas, is an English-speaking country consisting of 29 islands, 661 cays, and 2,387 islets. It is located at the north-east of the Caribbean Sea in the Atlantic Ocean north of Cuba, Hispaniola (Dominican Republic and Haiti) and the Caribbean Sea, northwest of the Turks and Caicos Islands, and southeast of the United States of America (nearest to the state of Florida). Its total land area is almost , with an estimated population of 330,000. Its capital is Nassau.



Airports

Airport names shown in bold indicate the airport has scheduled service on commercial airlines.

See also 
 List of airports by ICAO code: M#MY - Bahamas
 List of islands of the Bahamas
 List of islands of the Bahamas by total area
 Districts of the Bahamas
 Transport in the Bahamas
 Wikipedia: WikiProject Aviation/Airline destination lists: North America#Bahamas

References 

 
 
  - includes IATA codes
 Great Circle Mapper: Airports in the Bahamas - IATA and ICAO airport codes
 World Aero Data: Airports in the Bahamas
 Airport records for Bahamas at Landings.com. Retrieved 2013-08-08

Bahamas
Airports
Airports
Bahamas